Moskva-3 is a train station of the Yaroslavsky suburban railway line. It is located in the North-Eastern Administrative Okrug, Moscow,  from Yaroslavsky Rail Terminal.

It consists of two insular platforms while the western one is broader and more heavily used. There are 4 tracks available. The platforms are connected to each other with the pedestrian bridge. In the middle of the platforms, semi-transparent roofs are installed. The south end of the platforms is curved. The platforms are surrounded by the depot tracks so the only way in and out is via the bridge.

Moskva-3 and Moskva-2 depots are located nearby.

Alekseyevskaya metro station is reachable in around 10–15 minutes of walk and many passengers use this interchange in order to pay less (Yaroslavsky Rail Terminal and Moskva-3 station are in different tariff zones). Also Rizhskaya railway station is located not far from Moskva-3.

There are exits at the 1 Mytishchinskaya Street and 2 Luchevoy Prosek in the Sokolniki Park.

The station was constructed in 1929 for the uses of VNIIZhT.

References

Railway stations in Moscow
Railway stations of Moscow Railway
Railway stations in Russia opened in 1929